Hermann Achmüller (born 17 February 1971) is an Italian male mountain runner, who won a medal at the World Long Distance Mountain Running Championships (2007).

He won Vienna City Marathon in 2006 and Jungfrau Marathon in 2008.

References

External links
 

1971 births
Living people
Italian male marathon runners
Italian male mountain runners
Sportspeople from Bruneck
21st-century Italian people